Pigment Red 179 is an organic compound that is used as a pigment. Structurally, it is a derivative of perylene, although it is produced from perylenetetracarboxylic dianhydride by derivatization with methylamine.

It is used in watercolor paints, usually labeled as Perylene Maroon.

References 

Perylene dyes
Vat dyes
Imides